Liv Nilsson Stutz is a full professor at Linnaeus University. She is a bioarchaeologist and archaeologist.

Education 
She received her PhD in 2004 from Lund University.

Career 
Nilsson Stutz is an editor of the journal Archaeological Dialogues. She was a panellist in the plenary session of the 2019 TAG conference.

Selected publications 

 Nilsson Stutz, Liv. 2003. Embodied Rituals and Ritualized Bodies: Tracing Ritual Practices in Late Mesolithic Burials.
 Nilsson Stutz, Liv. 2008. More than metaphor: approaching the human cadaver in archaeology. BAR INTERNATIONAL SERIES.
 Nilsson Stutz, Liv. 2007. Archaeology, Identity and the Right to Culture. Anthropological perspectives on repatriation. Current Swedish Archaeology 15: 1-16.
 Nilsson Stutz, Liv. 2010. The way we bury our dead. Reflections on mortuary ritual, community and identity at the time of the Mesolithic-Neolithic transition
 Nilsson Stutz, Liv.  2013. Claims to the past. A critical view of the arguments driving repatriation of cultural heritage and their role in contemporary identity politics. Journal of Intervention and Statebuilding.
 S. Tarlow and L. Nilsson Stutz (eds) 2013 The Oxford Handbook of the Archaeology of Death and Burial. Oxford: Oxford University Press.
 Liv Nilsson Stutz 2018. A Future for Archaeology: In Defense of an Intellectually Engaged, Collaborative and Confident Archaeology. Norwegian Archaeological Review 51(1-2): 48-56, DOI: 10.1080/00293652.2018.1544168

References 

Academic staff of Linnaeus University
Year of birth missing (living people)
Living people
Swedish archaeologists
Swedish women archaeologists
Bioarchaeologists